Adrian Alexander Graham Mee (born 29 May 1963) is a South African-born English former first-class cricketer.

Mee was born at Johannesburg in May 1963, but was educated in England at Merchant Taylors' School. From there he went up to Oriel College, Oxford. While studying at Oxford, he played first-class cricket for Oxford University from 1984–87, making ten appearances. Mee scored 191 runs in his ten matches, at an average of 12.73 and with a high score of 51.

References

External links

1963 births
Living people
Cricketers from Johannesburg
English people of South African descent
People educated at Merchant Taylors' School, Northwood
Alumni of Oriel College, Oxford
English cricketers
Oxford University cricketers